Santa Cristina may refer to:
 
Saint Christina, several Catholic saints
Santa Cristina di Paulilatino, ancient sanctuary in Paulilatino, Sardinia, Italy

Places
Santa Cristina d'Aspromonte, Calabria, Italy 
Santa Cristina e Bissone, Lombardy, Italy
Santa Cristina Gela, Sicily, Italy 
Santa Cristina Gherdëina, South Tyrol, Italy
Santa Cristina d'Aro, Spain 
Santa Cristina de la Polvorosa, Spain 
Santa Cristina de Valmadrigal, Spain
Tahuata, French Polynesia

Churches and parishes
Santa Cristina (Pisa), Italy 
Couto (Santa Cristina), Portugal
Santa Cristina de Lena, Spain